Ágnes Farkas (born 21 April 1973) is a former Hungarian handball player. She won a gold medal at the 2000 European Championship, and earned a silver medal at the 2000 Summer Olympics and at the 1995 and 2003 World Championships.

Career

Club
Farkas started to play handball for Építők SC, where she stayed until 1992, when she moved to Budapesti Spartacus. A year later. she joined Ferencvárosi TC, where she spent six seasons. There, she has achieved her greatest club successes, including league and cup titles, EHF Champions League and EHF Cup silver medals. Thanks to her outstanding performances over the years, she is regarded as a club icon by Ferencváros fans.

She also competed abroad, playing for German side Borussia Dortmund and later collecting two Croatian cup and Croatian championship title with Podravka Koprivnica. Farkas played her last seasons for Danish side Aalborg DH, crowning her career with a Danish league silver in her final year.

Although in April 2005, Gjerpen IF offered her a one-year contract with the option for another year, Farkas stated she has no desire to stay in professional handball and eventually retired at the end of the season.

However, she did not stay away from the sport entirely after her retirement, as she trains children.

International
She debuted on the Hungarian national team on 16 October 1993 against Poland, and participated in her first World Championship in that year, finishing seventh. In 1994, she was named the top scorer of the European Championship. One year later, she was a member of the team that won a silver medal at the World Championship, organized jointly by Austria and Hungary. In 1996, she was forced to the sidelines by an injury and missed both the Olympic Games and the European Championship that year.

She placed ninth in the World Championship in 1997. She won a bronze medal on the European Championship the next year and finished fifth in 1999. She was a member of the 2000 Summer Olympics silver medal team, and was also selected to the squad that triumphed at the European Championship the same year. In 2002, she achieved fifth place in the European Championship with Hungary and was given the award as top scorer.

She participated on the 2003 World Championship and also took part at the 2004 Summer Olympics in Athens, where Hungary finished fifth.

Achievements

Club
Nemzeti Bajnokság I:
Winner: 1991, 1994, 1995, 1996, 2002
Magyar Kupa:
Winner: 1992, 1994, 1995, 1996, 2000, 2003
German Cup:
Winner: 1997
Croatian Championship:
Winner: 1998, 1999
Croatian Cup:
Winner: 1998, 1999
Damehåndboldligaen:
Silver Medallist: 2005
EHF Champions League:
Finalist: 2002
EHF Cup Winners' Cup:
Finalist: 1994
EHF Cup:
Finalist: 1997
EHF Champions Trophy:
Winner: 1999
Third Placed: 2002

International
Olympic Games:
Silver Medalist: 2000
World Championship:
Silver Medalist: 1995, 2003
European Championship:
Winner: 2000
Bronze Medalist: 1998

Awards and recognition
 European Championship Top Scorer: 1994, 2002
 Nemzeti Bajnokság I Top Scorer: 2001
 Hungarian Handballer of the Year: 2001, 2002
 Knight's Cross of the Order of Merit of the Republic of Hungary:2000

References

External links
 Ágnes Farkas factsheet on Handball.hu
 Ágnes Farkas player profile on the European Handball Federation Official Website

1973 births
Living people
Handball players from Budapest
Hungarian female handball players
Olympic handball players of Hungary
Olympic silver medalists for Hungary
Handball players at the 2000 Summer Olympics
Handball players at the 2004 Summer Olympics
Olympic medalists in handball
Expatriate handball players
Hungarian expatriate sportspeople in Germany
Hungarian expatriate sportspeople in Croatia
Hungarian expatriate sportspeople in Denmark
Knight's Crosses of the Order of Merit of the Republic of Hungary (civil)
Medalists at the 2000 Summer Olympics
RK Podravka Koprivnica players